Events in the year 1942 in Bulgaria.

Incumbents 
Monarch – Boris III

Events 

 June 5 – The United States declared war on Bulgaria following the latter's joined of the Axis bloc the previous year.

References 

 
1940s in Bulgaria
Years of the 20th century in Bulgaria
Bulgaria
Bulgaria